The Maple Leaf 42 is a Canadian sailboat that was designed by Stan Huntingford as a cruiser and first built in 1976.

Production
The design was built by Cooper Enterprises in Port Coquitlam, British Columbia, starting in 1976, but the company went out of business in 1990 and it is now out of production.

Design
The Maple Leaf 42 is a recreational keelboat, built predominantly of fibreglass, with wood trim. It has a masthead sloop rig, a raked stem, a plumb transom, a skeg-mounted rudder controlled by a wheel and a fixed fin keel. It displaces  and carries  of ballast.

See also
List of sailing boat types

References

External links
Interior tour video

Keelboats
1970s sailboat type designs
Sailing yachts
Sailboat type designs by Stan Huntingford
Sailboat types built by Cooper Enterprises